Marinomonas primoryensis is a Gram-negative, aerobic, psychrophilic, halophilic and motile bacterium from the genus of Marinomonas which has been isolated from coastal sea ice.

References

External links
Type strain of Marinomonas primoryensis at BacDive -  the Bacterial Diversity Metadatabase

Oceanospirillales
Bacteria described in 2003